Robert Dougall, MBE (27 November 1913 – 18 December 1999) was an English broadcaster and ornithologist, mainly known as a newsreader and announcer.

Early life and radio broadcasting
Dougall was born and educated in Croydon, Surrey. He attended Whitgift School but did not carry on to university despite having some talent in languages, specifically French and German. He joined the BBC initially in the accounts department, but soon found a job as an announcer for the BBC Empire Service (the predecessor of the BBC World Service) on his 21st birthday in 1934. By 1939, he had risen to the position of senior announcer and his was the voice that announced to the world Britain's declaration of war on Germany in September of that year. Shortly before this announcement, he had transmitted a message as an "anonymous" Englishman (although speaking in German), imploring Germany to withdraw its forces and avert the impending conflict:
"I got the first page with about three minutes to go. Then, the red light came on and it was up to me. It was an intensely dramatic script and most of the pages were fed to me at the microphone, so I had to get it right first time. God knows I put my heart into it."

Dougall worked as a radio reporter during the early part of the Second World War, but also served with the Royal Navy from 1942. He resumed his broadcasting career after demobilisation in 1946 as an announcer and newsreader for the BBC Home Service. In 1947, Dougall was appointed Programme Manager for the BBC's Far Eastern Service, a position which required him to move to Singapore.

Television news
Dougall's radio work took a back seat when he returned to London in 1951 to work as a television newsreader. (He is thought to have been the only person from the BBC's early radio service who had an enduring career in television.) Between 1946 and 1955, the BBC News was merely voiced over a photograph of Big Ben, a measure sanctioned by Chief News Editor Tahu Hole to reinforce the absolute impartiality for which the corporation was renowned. However, the coming of commercial television and ITN in 1955 prompted the BBC to have its newsreaders perform to camera – indeed, they began this approach only three weeks before ITN began transmission. Dougall was among the first of these newsreaders to appear in-vision in 1955 (the others were his contemporaries Kenneth Kendall and Richard Baker, with Kendall being the very first).
In 1960, he portrayed a newsreader in the film Danger Tomorrow.

Dougall presented general BBC News reports and the Newsroom programme during the 1960s and was appointed a Member of the Most Excellent Order of the British Empire (MBE) in 1965, receiving his honour on the same day as the Beatles. He was the first person to present the long-running BBC Nine O'Clock News in 1970, continuing in this role until his retirement from the newsroom in 1973.

Post-retirement
Like Peter Woods, Richard Baker and Kenneth Kendall, Dougall was considered an archetypal newsreader and frequently appeared as himself in comedy programmes of the 1970s and early 1980s, including The Goodies and Yes Minister. He also presented seven series of Channel 4's over-60s programme Years Ahead over four years and appeared in an advertising campaign for the jewellers Prestons of Bolton during the 1980s. His voice provides the news announcement that Big Ben chimed seven times at 6 p.m. in the Bond film Thunderball (1965).

Dougall was also known for his love of animals and birds and he was president of the RSPB for a five-year period. He wrote several books about birds in the 1970s and an autobiography, In and Out of the Box (1973), a witty account of life in the Reithian BBC, which he had joined as its youngest staff announcer on his 21st birthday in 1934, and beyond. He lived in Walberswick in Suffolk though his main home for many years was in Hampstead in London.

Family
Dougall's granddaughter Rose is a singer/songwriter, formerly with Brighton band the Pipettes. Dougall's grandson Tom Dougall was the lead guitarist with Brighton band Joe Lean and the Jing Jang Jong, before leaving to form Toy, who are signed to Heavenly Records.

Bibliography

In and out of the box (1973) 
Now for the good news (1976) 
A Celebration of Birds, Collins and Harvill Press (1978) 
The Ladybird Book Of British Birds
Basil Ede's Birds, Severn House (1980) 
foreword by The Duke of Edinburgh
Birdwatch Round Britain with Herbert Axell, Collins and Harvill (1982) 
foreword by Ian Prestt

Contributions
An Introduction To Bird and Wildlife Photography in Still and Movie, Marchington, John and Clay, Anthony, Faber & Faber (1974) – Foreword.

References

External links
BBC obituary

1913 births
1999 deaths
BBC newsreaders and journalists
BBC World Service people
Members of the Order of the British Empire
People educated at Whitgift School
People from Croydon
People from Walberswick
Royal Society for the Protection of Birds people
Birdwatchers